Takashi Uemura (植村 隆, Uemura Takashi) is a Japanese academic and former journalist who, while a reporter for The Asahi Shimbun, wrote about comfort women. He later came under scrutiny for alleged inaccuracy of terminology and omissions of information. Rival newspapers attacked him for twisting the truth, and more far-right figures went so far as to accuse him of fabrication.

His mother-in-law is Yang Sun-Im, a Korean activist who heads the Association for the Pacific War Victims and plaintiff groups for lawsuits by former comfort women. Yang was charged with fraudulently misleading donors to her organization, but has been acquitted, according to Uemura.

Kim Hak-sun, story of a comfort woman 

Uemura ran a story dated August 11, 1991 in the Asahi newspaper, which profiled a former comfort woman based on a tape-recorded testimony. The identity of the woman was withheld from Uemura at the time, but later it transpired that she was Kim Hak-sun. Kim disclosed her identity in a press conference she held 3 days after this article.

The precise wording in Uemura's article was as follows: "she was taken away under the name of the 'women volunteer corps'" and was a "Korean comfort woman serving the army.

Uemura followed up with another article on December 25, 1991, based on the interview of Kim Hak-sun conducted by Japanese lawyers.

Controversy

By 2014, Uemura had retired from the newspaper and was seeking university teaching positions. The articles Uemura had written in the 1990s about the comfort women came under fire, criticized for the choice of language as well as suppression of certain crucial information.

In 2014 Asahi retracted certain comfort women-related stories dating to the 1990s which were based on Seiji Yoshida's discredited testimony. There had been a pall of suspicion hanging over the veracity of Seiji's alleged accounts since soon after its publication. As a collateral fallout of these retractions, Uemura, whose articles were also subjected to certain critiques aforementioned, got labeled  as "fabricator of the comfort women" by "Right-wing tabloids", even though Uemura was not the writer of these pieces based on Yoshida's hoax. Uemura has insisted he did not write any stories based on the Yoshida testimony.

While Uemura's articles were not outright retracted, Uemura's reporting on the comfort women were criticized and subjected to corrigenda in Asahi's "Corrections" article. Specifically, his phraseology that the "comfort women" were recruited "nominally as women volunteer corps", and secondly, for omitting the Korean victim Kim Hak-sun's background that she had been a kisaeng (courtesan) in-training prior to being dispatched as a comfort woman in China.

This "Corrections" piece was issued in the form of a "Third-party Committee Report".

Malapropism allegations 

Rival papers such as the Sankei and Yomiuri have attacked the Uemura's use of the term  to mean "comfort women", and similar usage of "volunteer corps" (teishin-tai) in an Asahi newspaper glossary piece. The Sankei newspaper has accused Uemura of "distortions of facts" in using such terminology, even though the Asahi's "Corrections" piece, the Third-party committee concluded there was no "distortion" here on Uemura's part.

The thrust of the criticism here is that the term Joshi Teishin-tai "women volunteer corps" was an entity clearly distinguishable from comfort women. The "women volunteer corps" has been described as a body akin to "Rosie the Riveter" in the U.S. Critics say that these comfort women were never recruited "as a" volunteer corps in fact, or even by name.

However, the instance of the term "volunteers" (teishin-tai) being used to refer to "comfort women" is hardly unique to the Asahi's or Uemura's articles dating to 1991–1992. There are multiple instances where the term has been used in the sense of "comfort women" in Korea, including a 1973 book, a 1946 newspaper article, and a name of two support organization for Korean comfort women.

As a matter of fact, the tape recording of the comfort woman (who turned out to be Kim Hak-sun) which Uemura used for his article had been provided him by the support group that refers to the comfort women as "volunteer corps". While its official English name is The Korean Council for the Women Drafted for Military Sexual Slavery by Japan, its native Korean name is Han-guk Jeongsindae Munje Daechaek Hyeobuihoe which transliterates into Japanese as Kankoku Teishintai Mondai Taisaku Kyogikai" and literally means "The Korean Council to Address the Issue of the Volunteer Corps". The fact that Uemura obtained access to hear the tape from this organization is plainly stated in his August 11 article.

When questioned in 2015, Uemura stated he could not ascertain if the term Joshi Teishin-tai ("women volunteer corps") actually appeared in the tape of Kim Hak-sun's testimony he listened to, since he did not retain a copy of the tape, leaving possibility the open that Kim did not use the term in the tape. As Uemura has pointed out, Kim Hak-sun was subsequently quoted as saying "I belonged to the volunteer corps" in such Korean Newspapers as the Joongang Ilbo. but Kim was also being introduced to the world at large as someone who was conducted away under the pretext of "volunteer corps" by Professor  who headed the support organization, and  Yun was the intermediary who spoke to Uemura and provided access to the tape, and additionally, Yun recounted her own experience where she withdrew from college because her parents feared she could be coerced into joining the "women's volunteer corps". There was admittedly a popular notion that the "volunteer corps" was linked with the Japanese government implementing forced deployment of Korean women as sex workers, but this was strictly a rumor according to critics of the  "paradigm" that the comfort women were forced, and if the brothel positions were being lied to as factory jobs, such misrepresentations were only undertaken by Korean human traffickers rather than the Japanese "colonial authorities" according to these critics.

Alleged suppression of Kim's kisaeng background 

Three days after Uemura's article, Kim Hak-sun held her press conference August 14, 1991 attended by The Hokkaido Shimbun and Korean media where she revealed she attended a kisaeng school for three years, starting at the age of 14. Subsequently on August 15, the Korean newspaper The Hankyoreh wrote a piece revealing that Kim "was sold to a kisaeng school (gwonbeon)  in Pyongyang at the age of 14 by her mother, and taken away (some years later) by her gwonbeon foster-father.

Ms. Kim, who finished her three-year training, thought it was her first job and was taken by her foster-father in front of a unit with over 300 Japanese troops in North China".

It was alleged by Professor Tsutomu Nishioka in articles written by the reporter for the Shūkan Bunshun weekly tabloid that Uemura must have been privy to the information about Kim's kisaeng background but had deliberately suppressed it. In 2014, Uemura stated that he had not heard her mention the kisaeng school background in the tape, and in October 2019, the tape was produced as evidence to the Tokyo District Court, revealing that the word kisaeng went unmentioned.

Pressures and threats of harm 

Uemura left the Asahi Shimbun in March 2014, to pursue a second career as university lecturer. When the anti-Asahi bashing started faulting them for the comfort women coverage, Uemura became the target alongside. Hokusei Gakuen University in Sapporo, in northern Japan, where he lectures, has come under pressure to fire him. The college was bombarded by anonymous letters demanding his removal. "Many Japanese-language users of social media such as Twitter and Facebook have joined in the drubbing of the Asahi, accusing it of “damaging” Japan’s reputation", according to The Japan Times. This conduct has escalated into blackmail in the case of  extremists among social media users. There has even been a bomb threat on this Hokkaido campus, blamed on  ultra-nationalists; There has also been a call to drive Uemura's teenage daughter into suicide, which also has been attributed to the ultra-right.

Libel suits 
In articles which ran in the weekly news magazine Shūkan Bunshun condemning Uemura, Professor Tsutomu Nishioka who was one of the sources, accused Uemura of engaging in willful "fabrication". Uemura has since initiated legal proceedings over the public accusation against its publisher, the Bungeishunjū publishing company.
On March 12, 2021, the Supreme Court handed down a verdict dismissing all of Uemura’s appeal finally.

On January 9, 2015, Uemura filed a defamation suit with the Tokyo District Court against Nishioka, then-professor of Korean studies at Tokyo Christian University, and Bungeishunjū, Ltd. (the publisher of Shūkan Bunshun) in response to the public accusations against him.

The suit focused on three claims made by Nishioka: first, that Uemura's depiction of Kim being "taken away under the name of the 'women volunteer corps'" as involving a misnomer and constituting a fabrication of facts; second, that Uemura knowingly suppressed Kim's background as a kisaeng in training to alter the story of her becoming comfort women that was different from the truth, third, that Uemura had written his piece to influence the impending class-action lawsuits by former comfort women because Uemura' Korean mother-in-law headed a comfort women support organization involved in this litigation.

Uemura provided the following counterarguments to these points. The term "volunteer corps" at least was indeed used as synonym for comfort women in Korea and not a term conjured up by him. Kim being sent to kisaeng school and she being turned into comfort women were two separate events. On the third point, he said he accepted the assignment based on a lead given him by the Seoul bureau chief of his newspaper (not at his mother-in-law's behest), and he denied having written the piece to fulfill ulterior motives that Nishioka accused him of.

On February 18, 2020, Sapporo High Court handed down a verdict dismissing all of Uemura’s appeal.

Explanatory notes

References

Academic staff of Hokusei Gakuen University
Year of birth missing (living people)
Living people